Croquet has historically been a sport in Australia where men and women were able to compete on a level playing field.

While not being urged to avoid competition, women had few opportunities to compete in sport in Australia until the 1880s.  After that date, new sporting facilities were being built around the country and many new sport clubs were created. The sport of croquet was being played by Australian women as early as 1881 in Queensland.  The sport was viewed as acceptable because it was not seen as an overly competitive one.  Tournaments were held for female enthusiasts of the sport.  These tournaments were events at which to socialise, where refreshments and cakes were sold. One of the reason women were encouraged to play croquet, tennis and golf during the late 19th century was because it was scene as beneficial to their health.  These sports were also seen as passive, non-aggressive and non-threatening to the period's concepts of masculinity and femininity.

Croquet became part of the women's physical education curriculum during the 1880s.  The largest area to adopt this sport in the curriculum was in Victoria at schools like MLC Kew, which borrowed heavily from a British sporting tradition. At some schools, there were purpose built croquet courts.

In Australia and Queensland's early colonial history, tennis and croquet were acceptable sports for society women to participate in.  During that period, women wore big hats and dresses that covered their arms and legs.  The sport became a popular one for women around 1890.  There were organised competitions for women at All Hallows Convent in Queensland during the 1920s.

By the 1910s, there were many women playing that sport manufacturers began to see the power of creating advertising targeting them. Ads for women's golf, tennis and croquet appeared in such publications as the Bulletin and the Brisbane Girls' Grammar Magazine.

In 1940, a study of 314 women in New Zealand and Australia was done. Most of the women in the study were middle class, conservative, Protestant and white. The study found that 183 participated in sport.  The sixth most popular sport that these women participated in was croquet, with 9 having played the sport.

Australian women's sports had an advantage over many other women's sport organisations around the world in the period after World War II. Women's sport organisations had largely remained intact and were holding competitions during the war period.  This structure survived in the post war period.  Women's sport were not hurt because of food rationing, petrol rationing, population disbursement, and other issues facing post-war Europe. This gave Australian women a competitive advantage during the post war era.

See also

 Netball in Australia
 Women's soccer in Australia
 Women's field hockey in Australia

References

Bibliography

 
 
 

Croquet
Croquet in Australia